Shaun Marshall (born 3 October 1978 in Fakenham, England) is a professional footballer playing with Eastern Counties League Premier Division side Dereham Town, where he plays as a goalkeeper.

Marshall started his career at Cambridge United where he made over 150 appearances. He has also played for Stevenage Borough and Notts County. He was released by King's Lynn at the end of the 2006–07 season.

External links
 

Living people
1978 births
Association football goalkeepers
English footballers
Cambridge United F.C. players
Stevenage F.C. players
Notts County F.C. players
King's Lynn F.C. players
Dereham Town F.C. players
People from Fakenham